Anju Mahendru is an Indian actress. She is best known as Reeva in Kahiin to Hoga, Kamini Gupta in Kasautii Zindagii Kay and Beeji in Ek Hazaaron Mein Meri Behna Hai.

Personal life
Mahendru was briefly engaged to cricket player Gary Sobers.

Mahendru had a long relationship with actor Rajesh Khanna from 1966 to 1972. Khanna's mother had wanted Khanna to marry soon, since he had turned 27 and had become hugely popular by 1969, but when Khanna proposed Anju in 1971 she said she wanted to postpone her marriage as she wanted to make career as an actress. Khanna continued to love Mahendru and kept asking her to marry him. Mahendru's mother was fond of Khanna and Khanna went on to gift them a bungalow as well. But then there were reports of her dating Gary Sobers in 1971 and later Imtiaz Khan from 1972 and Khanna had become fed up with her non-commitment to marriage, which resulted in Khanna breaking up with Mahendru in 1972.

It was then that Khanna married Dimple Kapadia in March 1973, eight months before the film Bobby released. Anju and Rajesh did not speak with  each other till 1987. Anju dated Imtiaz Ali from 1972 to 1979 but Anju broke off from Imtiaz in 1979.

Anju became friends again with Rajesh from 1988 and Anju remained his close friend till Khanna's death and was by his side when he died. She confessed in an interview that it was because of her immaturity that she frivolously declined Khanna's offer of marriage to her in 1971 and had she accepted marriage she would have remained his wife.

Career
Mahendru started modelling at the age of 13. She was discovered by poet and lyricist Kaifi Azmi who recommended her to Basu Bhattacharya. Basu cast her in Uski Kahani in 1966. Uski Kahani was the debut film for Mahendru as well as the first directorial venture of Basu Bhattacharya. She later went on to act in films such as Jewel Thief, Bandhan, Intaqam and Dastak. She never made it as a leading lady and moved to character roles. She was also featured in Nari Hira's television films featuring up and coming Aditya Pancholi in the mid-1980s.

She made a comeback in the 1990s in television acting in various soaps. She played Trishna's mother-in-law in the TV serial Hamari Betiyoon Ka Vivaah on Zee TV. She acted as Maan's daadi in Geet – Hui Sabse Parayi.  she also played the role of Jeevika, Maanvi, and Daboo's daadi in Ek Hazaaron Mein Meri Behna Hai. She is seen as Sujatha in StarPlus' Yeh Hai Mohabbatein. Currently, she is seen as Gayatri Singh, the grandmother of the female lead, Anami, in Rishton Ka Chakravyuh on StarPlus.

Filmography 
 2022 Appnapan – Badalte Rishton Ka Bandhan
 Parchhayee (Web series) (2019) as Mrs Ellen
 Mariam Khan - Reporting Live (TV series) (2018) as Beeji
 Rishton Ka Chakravyuh (TV series) (2017) as Gayatri Vikram Singh
 Soadies (2017)
 Kasautii Zindagii Kay (TV Series) (2005-2006) as Kaamini Gupta
 Ek Hazaaron Mein Meri Behna Hai (TV series) (2011-2013) as Beeji
 Yeh Hai Mohabbatein (TV series) (2015) as Sujata Kumar
 Do Dil Bandhe Ek Dori Se (TV series) (2013-2014)... Renuka 
 Kuch Toh Log Kahenge (2012-2013) (TV series) as Dr Aradhana Bhardwaj
 Geet – Hui Sabse Parayi (2010-2011) as Sawatri Devi Khurana (Maan's Dadi)
 The Dirty Picture (2011) as Naila
 I Hate Luv Storys (2010) as Jay's mother
 Humko Deewana Kar Gaye (2006)
 Page 3 (2005) as Ritu Bajaj
 Mohabbat Ho Gayi Hai Tumse (2005)
 Kahiin to Hoga (2004) as Reva Shergill (Sujal's Stepmom)
 Satta (2003)
 Kyon? (2003) as Sunidhi Narang
 Saathiya (2002) as  Prema
 Waah! Tera Kya Kehna (2002) as Meena's mom
 A Pocket Full of Dreams (2001) as Asha
 Muskaan (1999) as Shama Khan (Sameer's mother) 
 Sukanya (1998) TV Series as Babli
 X Zone (1998) 
 English Babu Desi Mem (1996) as TV Interviewer
 Aarohan (TV)
 Swabhimaan (1995) TV Series as Ranjana Devi
 Kabhi Yeh Kabhi Woh (1994-1995) as Rajni
 Dil Ki Baazi (1993) as Lalita V. Kashyap
Bomb Blast (1993 film)
Insaaf Ki Devi (1992) as Police Commissioner Geeta Mathur
 Jaan Tere Naam (1992) as Mrs. Ajay Malhotra
 Muskurahat (1992) as Mayadevi (Verma's sister)
 Khoon Bahaa Ganga Mein (1988)
 Hum To Chale Pardes (1988)
 Vijay (1988) as Bela
 Khatarnaak Irade (1987) as Anita
 Shingora (1986) (TV)
 Vakil Babu (1982) as Shanti (Prem's ex-girlfriend)
 Pyaas (1982)
 Ganga Ki Saugandh (1978) as Courtesan
 Darwaza (1978) as Reshma
 Mukti (1977) as Shanno
 Umar Qaid (1975)
 Prem Shastra (1974) as Barkha Arora
 Hanste Zakhm (1973)
 Dastak (1970)
 Bandhan (1969)
 Intaqam (1969) as Indu
 Sunghursh (1968) as Kundan's sister
 Jewel Thief (1967) as Neena
 Uski Kahani (1966)

References

External links
 

20th-century Indian actresses
21st-century Indian actresses
Indian film actresses
Actresses in Hindi cinema
Indian television actresses
Living people
Indian soap opera actresses
Actresses from Mumbai
Year of birth missing (living people)